Dennis William Townhill  (29 May 1925 – 18 July 2008) was an English organist and composer.

Born in Lincoln, he was educated at Lincoln School and studied under Dr Gordon Archbold Slater at Lincoln Cathedral.

Townhill composed a set of responses for use at Anglican evensong.

In 1970, Townhill became the driving force of a plan not only to safeguard the future of the Choir School of St Mary’s Cathedral, Edinburgh but to transform it into a new and vibrant entity. In 1972, the school was expanded into a specialist music school on the lines of the Yehudi Menuhin School,  with Lord Menuhin becoming patron and referring to it as "my younger sister-school in Scotland".

He was organist and choir master at:
St Paul's Church, Burton on Trent. 1942–1943
St. Mary le Wigford’s Church, Lincoln 1943–1947
St. Mary Magdalene, Bailgate, Lincoln, Lincoln 1947–1949
St James Church, Louth 1949–1956
Grimsby Parish Church 1956–1961
St Mary's Cathedral, Edinburgh 1961–1991

He retired in 1991.

References

1925 births
2008 deaths
Officers of the Order of the British Empire
English classical organists
British male organists
Cathedral organists
People from Lincoln, England
People educated at Lincoln Grammar School
20th-century organists
20th-century British conductors (music)
20th-century British male musicians
St Mary's Cathedral, Edinburgh (Episcopal)
Male classical organists